Cascade Pond is a small lake located south of Blue Mountain Lake, New York. Fish species present in the lake are brook trout, and black bullhead. There is access by trail from Lake Durant along the east shore. No motors are allowed on this lake.

References

Lakes of New York (state)
Lakes of Hamilton County, New York